Budjette Tan is a Filipino writer best known for writing the horror/crime komiks series Trese, co-creating it with artist Kajo Baldisimo. His work Trese has won the Philippine National Book Award for Best Graphic Literature of the Year in 2009, 2011, 2012. It has been adapted into an animated series by Netflix.

References 

Living people
Filipino comics artists
Filipino speculative fiction writers
Year of birth missing (living people)